2019 China Open may refer to:

 2019 China Open (badminton), a badminton tournament
 2019 China Open (snooker), a snooker tournament
 2019 China Open (tennis), a tennis tournament